Sassarese (natively sassaresu  or turritanu) is an Italo-Dalmatian language and transitional variety between Sardinian and Corsican. It is regarded as a Corso–Sardinian language because of Sassari's historic ties with Tuscany and geographical proximity to Corsica. Despite the robust Sardinian influences (in terms of vocabulary and phonology, as well as syntax), it still keeps its Corsican (and therefore Tuscan) roots, which closely relate it to Gallurese; the latter is linguistically considered a Corsican dialect despite its geographical location, although this claim is a matter of controversy. It has several similarities to the Italian language, and in particular to the old Italian dialects from Tuscany.

Sassarese is spoken by approximately 100,000 people, out of a total population of 175,000, in the northwest coastal areas of Sardinia, Italy. Large Sassarese-speaking communities are present in Sassari, Stintino, Sorso, and Porto Torres. The Sassarese varieties transitioning to Gallurese, known as the Castellanesi dialects, can be heard in Castelsardo, Tergu, and Sedini.

Sassarese emerged as an urban lingua franca in the late part of the age of the Judicates (13th–14th century), based on a mixture of different languages – namely Sardinian, Corsican/Tuscan, and Ligurian. The neighbouring Logudorese dialects of Sardinian exercised a significant influence on the modern linguistic development, along with some Catalan and Spanish vocabulary. There exist many modern and older works both on and in Sassarese, and a number of cultural, social, and theatre events are held regularly in connection with it.

In 1943 the German  linguist Max Leopold Wagner wrote:

Official status 
Sassarese is recognized as an official language by the regional government of Sardinia:

Text sample:Extract from the Gospel of Matthew, Mat. 10:15-22

See also 
 Sardinian, Corsican and Gallurese languages
 Sardinia, Sassari (Porto Torres, Sorso, Stintino, Castelsardo, Sedini and Tergu)

References

External links

 A ischora di sassaresu - Sassari.tv
 Saggio di grammatica sassarese, Antoninu Rubattu
 TOGO, Dizionario Italiano-Sassarese

Sassari
Languages of Sardinia
Sardinian language
Corsican language
Languages of Italy